Grigore Ureche (1590–1647) was a Moldavian chronicler who wrote on Moldavian history in his Letopisețul Țării Moldovei (Chronicles of the Land of Moldavia), covering the period from 1359 to 1594.

Biography
Grigore Ureche was the son of the influential Moldovan boyar Nestor Ureche, who was an advisor to a prince in Poland. Ureche spent his childhood in the Polish–Lithuanian Commonwealth, where he studied at the Jesuit College in L'viv. After returning to the Principality of Moldavia, he held many high-ranking offices in the courts of several Moldovan Hospodars. During the reign of Vasile Lupu (from 1634) Ureche became the administrator of Lower Moldavia.

Significance
Ureche is the first to assert the existence of the Romanian language and its Romance character. He also acknowledges the common Roman origin of the Romanians from Moldavia, Wallachia and Transylvania.

See also
Miron Costin
Ion Neculce
Dimitrie Cantemir

References

External links
The Chronicles of the land of Moldavia  at librariaelectronica.com
Biography at ro.biography.name
Grigore Ureche at istoria.md

Moldavian and Wallachian chroniclers
1590 births
1647 deaths
Romanian male writers
Early Modern Romanian writers
Writers from Lviv
17th-century Romanian people
17th-century male writers